Elections to the City of Edinburgh Council were held on 3 May 2012, the same day as the 2012 Scottish local elections. The election was the second using 17 new wards created as a result of the Local Governance (Scotland) Act 2004, each ward elected three or four Councillors using the single transferable vote system form of proportional representation system of election.

The main feature of the elections was the near obliteration of the Scottish Liberal Democrats as they collapsed from 17 seats on the city council to just 3, which saw them occupying the position as the smallest party. Their leader, and the leader of the council, Jenny Dawe, lost her seat in Meadows/Morningside, epitomising the poor performance. Scottish Labour replaced the Lib Dems as the largest party as they made 5 gains, winning 20 seats in total. The Scottish National Party became the second largest party, gaining 6 seats and 18 seats in total. The Scottish Conservatives retained 11 seats on the council while the Scottish Greens doubled their seat numbers to 6.

After the election a coalition was formed between the Labour Party and the SNP. This replaced the previous Lib Dem – SNP Coalition which had existed from 2007 to 2012.

Election result

 

Note: "Votes" are the first preference votes. The net gain/loss and percentage changes relate to the result of the previous Scottish local elections on 3 May 2007. This may differ from other published sources showing gain/loss relative to seats held at dissolution of Scotland's councils.

Ward summary

|- class="unsortable" align="centre"
!rowspan=2 align="left"|Ward
! % 
!Seats
! %
!Seats
! %
!Seats
! %
!Seats
! %
!Seats
! %
!Seats
!rowspan=2|Total
|- class="unsortable" align="center"
!colspan=2 | Labour
!colspan=2 | SNP
!colspan=2 | Conservative
!colspan=2 | Green
!colspan=2 | Lib Dem
!colspan=2 | Others
|-
|align="left"|Almond
|14.92
|0
|32.55
|1
|26.24
|1
|6.17
|0
|15.89
|1
|4.22
|0
|3
|-
|align="left"|Pentland Hills
|28.85
|1
|29.16
|1
|27.70
|1
|4.05
|0
|4.66
|0
|5.59
|0
|3
|-
|align="left"|Drum Brae/Gyle
|26.46
|1
|27.00
|1
|16.04
|0
|3.62
|0
|18.77
|1
|8.12
|0
|3
|-
|align="left"|Forth
|34.01
|2
|29.06
|1
|22.64
|1
|7.08
|0
|5.06
|0
|2.14
|0
|4
|-
|align="left"|Inverleith
|24.99
|1
|20.22
|1
|29.50
|1
|14.92
|1
|10.38
|0
| -
| -
|4
|-
|align="left"|Corstorphine/Murrayfield
|20.45
|0
|24.74
|1
|24.96
|1
|6.11
|0
|22.77
|1
|1.96
|0
|3
|-
|align="left"|Sighthill/Gorgie
|42.1
|2
|37.4
|2
|9.2
|0
|8.2
|0
|3.2
|0

| -
| -
|4
|-
|align="left"|Colinton/Fairmilehead
|17.87
|0
|20.59
|1
|52.00
|2
|4.91
|0
|3.62
|0
|1.01
|0
|3
|-
|align="left"| Fountainbridge/Craiglockhart
|23.24
|1
|23.54
|1
|21.15
|0
|24.07
|1
|7.34
|0
|0.66
|0
|3
|-
|align="left"|Meadows/Morningside
|19.64
|1
|15.78
|1
|29.90
|1
|19.75
|1
|12.30
|0
|2.63
|0
|4
|-
|align="left"|City Centre
|21.33
|1
|24.97
|1
|27.69
|1
|17.06
|0
|7.94
|0
|1.01
|0
|3
|-
|align="left"|Leith Walk
|33.24
|2
|28.48
|1
|8.11
|0
|20.28
|1
|5.09
|0
|4.81
|0
|4
|-
|align="left"|Leith
|32.1
|1
|32.4
|1
|6.5
|0
|18.9
|1
|9.0
|0
|1.1
|0
|3
|-
|align="left"|Craigentinny/Duddingston
|36.2
|2
|36.9
|1
|10.2
|0
|7.0
|0
|8.0
|0
|1.8
|0
|3
|-
|align="left"|Southside/Newington
|19.78
|1
|18.34
|1
|16.72
|1
|19.97
|1
|13.97
|0
|11.22
|0
|4
|-
|align="left"|Liberton/Gilmerton
|40.9
|2
|31.6
|1
|12.3
|1
|5.2
|0
|7.6
|0
|2.5
|0
|4
|-
|align="left"|Portobello/Craigmillar
|47.4
|2
|32.0
|1
|7.2
|0
|8.5
|0
|1.9
|0
|2.9
|0
|3
|- class="unsortable" class="sortbottom"
!align="left"| Total
!28.13
!20
!26.87
!18
!19.75
!11
!11.55
!6
!9.34
!3
!
!0
!58
|-
|}

Ward results

Almond
2007: 1xCon; 1xLib Dem; 1xSNP
2012: 1xSNP; 1xCon; 1xLib Dem
2007-2012 Change: No Change

Pentland Hills
2007: 1xCon; 1xSNP; 1xLab
2012: 1xSNP; 1xLab; 1xCon
2007-2012 Change: No Change

Drum Brae/Gyle
2007: 2xLib Dem; 1xSNP
2012: 1xLab; 1xSNP; 1xLib Dem
2007-2012 Change: Lab gain one seat from Lib Dem

 

 

                                                                                                       
                                     

=Outgoing Councillor from a different Ward.

Forth
2007: 1xSNP; 1xCon; 1xLib Dem; 1xLab
2012: 2xLab; 1xSNP; 1xCon
2007-2012 Change: Lab gain one seat from Lib Dem

Inverleith
2007: 1xLab; 1xCon; 1xSNP; 1xLib Dem
2012: 1xSNP; 1xCon; 1xLab; 1xGreen
2007-2012 Change: Green gain one seat from Lib Dem

Corstorphine/Murrayfield
2007: 2xLib Dem; 1xCon
2012: 1xCon; 1xSNP; 1xLib Dem
2007-2012 Change: SNP gain one seat from Lib Dem

Sighthill/Gorgie
2007: 2xLab; 1xSNP; 1xLib Dem
2012: 2xLab; 2xSNP;
2007-2012 Change: SNP gain one seat from Lib Dem

Colinton/Fairmilehead
2007: 2xCon; 1xLab
2012: 2xCon; 1xSNP
2007-2012 Change: SNP gain one seat from Lab

Fountainbridge/Craiglockhart
2007: 1xCon; 1xLab; 1xLib Dem
2012: 1xGrn; 1xLab; 1xSNP
2007-2012 Change: Grn and SNP gain one seat each from Con and Lib Dem

Meadows/Morningside
2007: 1xCon; 1xLib Dem; 1xGRN; 1xLab
2012: 1xCon; 1xGRN; 1xLab; 1xSNP
2007-2012 Change: SNP gain one seat from Lib Dem

   
 
   
  
  
   

 = Outgoing Councillor from a different Ward.

City Centre
2007: 1xSNP; 1xCon; 1xLib Dem
2012: 1xCon; 1xSNP; 1xLab
2007-2012 Change: Lab gain one seat from Lib Dem

Leith Walk
2007: 1xSNP; 1xLib Dem; 1xLab; 1xGRN
2012: 2xLab; 1xSNP; 1xGRN
2007-2012 Change: Lab gain one seat from Lib Dem

Leith
2007: 1xSNP; 1xLib Dem; 1xLab
2012: 1xLab; 1xGRN; 1xSNP
2007-2012 Change: GRN gain one seat from Lib Dem

Craigentinny/Duddingston
2007: 1xLab; 1xSNP; 1xLib Dem
2012: 2xLab; 1xSNP
2007-2012 Change: Lab gain one seat from Lib Dem

Southside/Newington
2007: 1xLab; 1xCon; 1xLib Dem; 1xGRN
2012: 1xGrn; 1xLab; 1xSNP; 1xCon
2007-2012 Change: SNP gain one seat from Lib Dem

Liberton/Gilmerton
2007: 2xLab; 1xSNP; 1xLib Dem
2012: 2xLab; 1xSNP; 1xCon
2007-2012 Change: Con gain one seat from Lib Dem

Portobello/Craigmillar
2007: 1xSNP; 1xLab; 1xLib Dem
2012: 2xLab; 1xSNP
2007-2012 Change: Lab gain one seat from Lib Dem

Post-election changes
† Liberton/Gilmerton SNP councillor Tom Buchanan died on 3 April 2013. A by-election was held on 20 June 2013 and was won by Labour's Keith John Robson.
†† Craigentinny/Duddingston Labour councillor Alex Dunn defected from the Labour Party and joined the SNP on 4 December 2013.
††† On 1 March 2014 Southside/Newington SNP councillor Jim Orr resigned from the party and became an Independent citing disillusionment with internal political spats.
†††† Leith Walk SNP councillor Deidre Brock was elected as an MP for Edinburgh North and Leith (UK Parliament constituency) on 7 May 2015 and resigned her Council seat on 24 June 2015. Leith Walk Green councillor Maggie Chapman resigned her seat on 30 June 2015 to focus her efforts on winning a Scottish Parliament seat in North East Scotland. A by-election for both seats was held on 10 September 2015, Lewis Ritchie defending the SNP seat and Labour's Marion Donaldson taking the other.
†††††† Almond Liberal Democrat councillor Alastair Shields resigned from the party and became an Independent after having been de-selected. He originally indicated that he would contest the 2017 local elections as an Independent, but ruled this out in October 2016.

By Elections since 2012

References

External links 
 election results 2012 on Council homepage

2012
2012 Scottish local elections
2010s in Edinburgh